David S. Shapira is an American businessman. He serves as Chairman, Chief Executive Officer and President of Giant Eagle, Inc. He joined the company in 1971 and has been President and CEO since 1980. He has also been involved in philanthropic causes. Until 2009, he was the chairman of Carnegie Mellon University's Board of Trustees.

In 1982, he co-founded  Phar-Mor with  Michael I. Monus.

In 2012, his daughter Laura Shapira Karet took over as CEO for private company Giant Eagle, Inc.

He was also a member of the board of Directors of Equitable Resources, Inc. (NYSE: EQT), a Pennsylvania natural gas and oil company with emphasis on the Appalachian area.

He received his undergraduate degree from Oberlin College in 1963 and an MA in Economics from Stanford University.

References

Stanford University alumni
Carnegie Mellon University trustees
Living people
American Jews
Year of birth missing (living people)